Strophurus is a genus of lizards in the family Diplodactylidae. All species of  Strophurus are  endemic to Australia, and are sometimes given the common names  phasmid geckos, spiny-tailed geckos, and striped geckos.

Description
The scales of the body are generally small and round, sometimes interspersed with enlarged scales and soft spines.

All members of this genus have a unique defense mechanism: the ability to squirt a harmless, foul-smelling fluid from their tails, which can create a highly flammable substance when mixed with ammonia. This fluid is used to deter birds while they are perching in shrubbery, being unusual in the family by exposing themselves during the day. As with many other geckos, they are also nocturnal. Some members lack spines and enlarged scales, while another subgroup features spines on the tail and other parts of the body.

Their habitat is amongst shrubs and hummock grass, but they occasionally move to the ground for warmth or to mate. This behavior is especially prominent in pregnant females, which use the additional warmth of rocks and roads to assist the development of the two eggs they carry.

Species
There are 20 known species of Strophurus, and a number of subspecies.

Nota bene: A binomial authority in parentheses indicates that the species was originally described in a genus other than Strophurus.

References

Further reading
Fitzinger L (1843). Systema Reptilium, Fasciculus Primus, Amblyglossae. Vienna: Braumüller & Seidel. 106 pp. + indices. (Strophurus, new genus, p. 96). (in Latin).
Nielsen SV, Oliver PM, Laver RJ, Bauer AM, Noonan BP (2016). "Stripes, jewels and spines: further investigations into the evolution of defensive strategies in a chemically defended gecko radiation (Strophurus, Diplodactylidae)". Zoologica Scripta 45 (5): 481-493.

External links

 
Geckos of Australia
Lizard genera
Taxa named by Leopold Fitzinger